Ptichodis infecta is a moth of the family Erebidae. It is found on Hispaniola, where it has been recorded from Haiti and the Dominican Republic.

References

Moths described in 1858
Ptichodis
Moths of the Caribbean